Väike-Pungerja is a village in Alutaguse Parish, Ida-Viru County in northeastern Estonia.

The entrance of the Estonia oil shale mine is located in Väike-Pungerja.

References

 

Villages in Ida-Viru County